Tmaň is a municipality and village in Beroun District in the Central Bohemian Region of the Czech Republic. It has about 1,200 inhabitants.

Administrative parts
Villages of Lounín and Slavíky are administrative parts of Tmaň.

References

External links

Villages in the Beroun District